Omiodes origoalis is a moth in the family Crambidae. It was described by Francis Walker in 1859. It is found in Indonesia (Sulawesi, Borneo) and north-eastern India.

References

Moths described in 1859
origoalis